Ceryx antiopa is a moth of the subfamily Arctiinae. It was described by Sergius G. Kiriakoff in 1953. It is found in the Democratic Republic of the Congo.

References

Ceryx (moth)
Moths described in 1953
Insects of the Democratic Republic of the Congo
Moths of Africa
Endemic fauna of the Democratic Republic of the Congo